Żohatyn  is a small village in the administrative district of Gmina Bircza, within Przemyśl County, Subcarpathian Voivodeship, in south-eastern Poland.

The village has a population of 160.

References

Villages in Przemyśl County